Gibson (April 26, 2002 – August 7, 2009) was a Harlequin Great Dane living in Grass Valley, California, United States recognized by the Guinness Book of World Records as the "World's Tallest Dog" in 2004, displacing "Harvey", the previous record holder.

World record holder 

Gibson was a certified therapy dog and appeared,  wearing his trademark bandanna, on several television shows including The Tonight Show, The Oprah Winfrey Show, and The Ellen DeGeneres Show. He was also the official "spokesdog" for ForeverLawn, the maker of K9Grass, based out of Uniontown, Ohio where Gibson could be seen on the occasional walk. The book Gibson Speaks: The World's Tallest Dog Talks About His Life tells his story.

In 2009, he lost one of his legs to bone cancer. Despite chemotherapy, the cancer spread to his lungs and spine, and Gibson could not be saved. On August 7, 2009, his owner had him euthanized.

See also
 List of individual dogs

References

External links 
 
 Slideshow of images of Gibson
 Video of Gibson visiting The Oprah Show
 Gibson on Animal Planet

2002 animal births
2009 animal deaths
Individual dogs in the United States